Ahmed Otaif (born 14 April 1983) is a retired Saudi professional footballer who played for Al-Shabab and the Saudi national team. He spent his entire playing career at Al-Shabab and captained the side from 2008 until his retirement in 2018. He won nine titles with Al-Shabab and captained the side to the 2011–12 Saudi Professional League title. Otaif earned 59 caps with the Saudi national team and represented them at three different tournaments including the 2011 AFC Asian Cup.

Ahmed Otaif is the older brother of current Al-Hilal player Abdullah Otayf and former Al-Shabab players Abdoh Otaif, Ali Otayf and Saqer Otaif.

Career statistics

Club

International
Statistics accurate as of match played 9 September 2013.

International goals

Honours
Al-Shabab
Saudi Professional League: 2003–04, 2005–06, 2011–12
King Cup: 2008, 2009, 2014
Saudi Super Cup: 2014
Prince Faisal bin Fahd Cup: 2008–09, 2009–10

Individual
Saudi Professional League Player of the Season: 2008–09

References

External links

Profile at slstat.com

1983 births
Living people
Sportspeople from Riyadh
Saudi Arabian footballers
Saudi Arabia youth international footballers
Saudi Arabia international footballers
Al-Shabab FC (Riyadh) players
2011 AFC Asian Cup players
Saudi Professional League players
Association football midfielders